Quebradanegra is a municipality and town of Colombia in the department of Cundinamarca.

Municipalities of Cundinamarca Department